Nancy Randolph Pearcey (born 1952) is an American evangelical author on the Christian worldview.

Education
Pearcey earned a BA from Iowa State University, an MA in Biblical Studies from Covenant Theological Seminary in St. Louis, Missouri. She also did additional non-degree study in philosophy at the Institute for Christian Studies in Toronto, Canada and received an honorary doctorate from Cairn University in 2007.

Career
Pearcey was the Francis A. Schaeffer Scholar for several years at the World Journalism Institute. In September 2007, Pearcey was named Scholar for Worldview Studies at the Center for University Studies at Philadelphia Biblical University, Langhorne, Pennsylvania. In 2011-12 Pearcey was on the faculty at Rivendell Sanctuary. In 2012, she became Scholar in Residence at Houston Baptist University. Pearcey is a columnist for the conservative magazine Human Events.

Intelligent design
Pearcey is a fellow of the Discovery Institute's Center for Science and Culture, the center of the intelligent design movement, where she has had the primary responsibility for promoting the movement's viewpoint through op-eds, for journals and magazine's, especially Marvin Olasky's World magazine. Pearcey was a contributor to the controversial pro-intelligent design high school textbook Of Pandas and People, which featured prominently in the Kitzmiller v. Dover Area School District trial.

Publications
 .
 .
 .
 .
   ECPA Gold Medallion Book Award 'Christianity and Society' category winner.
 .
 .
__ (2018)  Love Thy Body: Answering Hard Questions About Life and Sexuality, Baker Books, .

References

External links
 The Pearcey Report (official website of news, comment, information, and worldview)
 Pro-Existence (the weblog of Rick and Nancy Pearcey)

1952 births
Living people
American evangelicals
Biola University
Cairn University
Converts to Protestantism from atheism or agnosticism
American Christian Young Earth creationists
Discovery Institute fellows and advisors
Intelligent design advocates
Iowa State University alumni
Philosophers of religion
Protestant philosophers